Diloma aethiops, whose common names include scorched monodont, spotted black topshell, and in the Māori language pūpū, pūpū-mai, or māihi is a species of small sea snail, a marine gastropod mollusc in the family Trochidae, subfamily Monodontinae.

Description
The size of the shell varies between 15 mm and 30 mm. The thick, solid, imperforate shell has a depressed conical shape. It is blackish, dotted upon the ribs with yellow or white. The conic spire is more or less depressed with an acute apex. The five whorls are spirally strongly ridged. The ridges are nodulous and number three on the penultimate whorl. The interstices are spirally striate. The body whorl is depressed, angulate at the periphery, and concentrically lirate below. The lirae are coarsely granulose, about 5 in number. The aperture is very oblique. The outer lip is edged with blackish, then nacreous, and lined with opaque white, the thickening slightly notched at the place of the periphery. The oblique columella is nearly straight, flat, opaque white and backed by nacreous.

Animal: The foot is yellow below, with a brown stripe round the contour, black on the sides, with touches of yellowish-white behind; filaments greenish; mouth yellowish.

Distribution and Habitat
This species is endemic to New Zealand. It is common to abundant in rocky intertidal areas, where it is the only trochid found on open rock surfaces, in sheltered areas and semi-exposed coasts. In harbours or estuaries it often occurs with D. subrostrata on hard packed mud among empty bivalve shells.

References

 Miller M & Batt G, Reef and Beach Life of New Zealand, William Collins (New Zealand) Ltd, Auckland, New Zealand 1973
 Powell A W B, New Zealand Mollusca, William Collins Publishers Ltd, Auckland, New Zealand 1979 
 Willan, R.C.; Marshall, B.A.; Climo, F.M.; Cernohorsky, W.O. 1980: Rectification of nomenclature for Melagraphia aethiops (Gmelin) and Diloma bicanaliculata (Dunker) (Mollusca: Trochidae). New Zealand Journal of Marine and Freshwater Research 14: 413-415
 Donald K.M., Kennedy M. & Spencer H.G. (2005) The phylogeny and taxonomy of austral monodontine topshells (Mollusca: Gastropoda: Trochidae), inferred from DNA sequences. Molecular Phylogenetics and Evolution 37: 474–483.

External links
 

aethiops
Gastropods of New Zealand
Endemic fauna of New Zealand
Gastropods described in 1791
Taxa named by Johann Friedrich Gmelin
Endemic molluscs of New Zealand